Sámuel Literáti Nemes (1796–1842), Transylvanian-Hungarian antiquarian, infamous for many forgeries which even deceived some of the most renowned Hungarian scholars of the time.

Some Hungarian scholars suspect him to be involved in the forgery of Codex Rohonczi. This opinion goes back as far as 1866, to Károly Szabó (1824-1890), Hungarian historian.

References 

 SZABÓ, Károly: A régi hun-székely írásról [Of the Old Hun-Székely Writing System], Budapesti Szemle 6 (1866), 123-124. (Hungarian)

19th-century Hungarian people
Hungarian antiquarians
Forgers
People from Târgu Mureș
1796 births
1842 deaths